P. S. Ramakrishna Rao (12 October 1918 – 7 September 1986) was a veteran Telugu film director and producer. He married Bhanumathi, a multi-talented film artist from South India, on 8 August 1943.

Filmography
Gruhalakshmi (1967) (Producer, Director and Writer)
Vivaha Bandham (1964) (Producer and Director)
Anubandhalu (1963) (Director)
Aatma Bandhuvu (1962) (Director)
Batasari (1961) (Producer and Director)
Kaanal Neer (1961) (Director)
Sabhash Raja (1961) (Director)
Varudu Kaavaali (1957) (Producer and Director)
Manamagan Thevai (1957) (Director)
Chintamani (1956) (Producer and Director)Vipranarayana (1954) (Producer and Director)Chakrapani (1954) (Producer and Director)Bratuku Theruvu (1953) (Director)Chandirani (1953) (Producer)Prema (1952) (Producer and Director)Kaadhal (Producer and Director)Laila Majnu (1949) (Producer and Director)Ratnamala'' (1947) (Producer and Director)

External links

Film directors from Andhra Pradesh
Telugu film directors
1918 births
1986 deaths
People from Kurnool district
20th-century Indian film directors
Telugu screenwriters
Telugu film producers
Film producers from Andhra Pradesh
Screenwriters from Andhra Pradesh
20th-century Indian screenwriters